Ocrisiodes polyptychella is a species of snout moth in the genus Ocrisiodes. It was described by Ragonot in 1887, and is known from Iran.

References

Moths described in 1887
Phycitinae